Desha is an unincorporated community and census-designated place (CDP) in Independence County, Arkansas, United States. It was first listed as a CDP in the 2020 census with a population of 715.

Desha has a post office with ZIP code 72527.

Batesville School District operates area public schools. The Desha School District merged into the Batesville district on July 1, 1985.

Demographics

2020 census

Note: the US Census treats Hispanic/Latino as an ethnic category. This table excludes Latinos from the racial categories and assigns them to a separate category. Hispanics/Latinos can be of any race.

References

External links
Encyclopedia of Arkansas History & Culture entry

Unincorporated communities in Independence County, Arkansas
Unincorporated communities in Arkansas
Census-designated places in Independence County, Arkansas